Luan Pinari (born 27 October 1977 in Tiranë) is a former Albanian footballer who played for Dinamo Tirana, KF Tirana and Partizani Tirana, becoming one of few players to have been at all three clubs in the Albanian capital. He was also a member of the Albania national team and earned 5 senior international caps.

International career
He made his debut for Albania in an August 1998 friendly match away against Cyprus and earned a total of 5 caps, scoring 1 goal. His final international was a February 2003 friendly win over Vietnam in which he scored Albania's fifth goal.

National team statistics

Honours
Albanian Superliga: 2
 2002, 2004

References

External links

1977 births
Living people
Footballers from Tirana
Albanian footballers
Association football defenders
Albania under-21 international footballers
Albania international footballers
FK Dinamo Tirana players
KF Tirana players
FK Partizani Tirana players
Kategoria Superiore players